Moussa Dar'i Synagogue is a Karaite synagogue in Cairo, Egypt.

Synagogues in Cairo
Karaite synagogues